The 2012–13 East Midlands Counties Football League season was the 5th in the history of East Midlands Counties Football League, a football competition in England.

League

The league featured 16 clubs from the previous season, along with three new clubs:
Aylestone Park, promoted from the Leicestershire Senior League
Basford United, promoted from the Central Midlands Football League
Lutterworth Athletic, promoted from the Leicestershire Senior League

League table

References

External links
 East Midlands Counties Football League official site

2012–13
10